Passing Ships is a studio album by American jazz pianist Andrew Hill featuring performances recorded in 1969 for the Blue Note  label but not released until 2003. The album features Hill with a six-piece horn section performing seven original compositions.

Reception

The Allmusic review by Thom Jurek awarded the album 4½ stars and stated "The music here is ambitious. Hill's scoring for one reed, two trumpets, and low brass is remarkable for the time".

Track listing
All compositions by Andrew Hill
 "Sideways" - 4:09  
 "Passing Ships" - 7:08  
 "Plantation Bag" - 8:32  
 "Noon Tide" - 9:49  
 "The Brown Queen" - 6:22  
 "Cascade" - 6:27  
 "Yesterday's Tomorrow" - 5:11
Recorded on November 7 (tracks 2, 5 & 6) and November 14 (tracks 1, 3, 4 & 7), 1969.

Personnel
Andrew Hill - piano
Dizzy Reece - trumpet (solo on tracks 1, 3, 4) Woody Shaw - trumpet (solo on tracks 2, 5-7)
Joe Farrell - alto flute, English horn, bass clarinet, soprano saxophone, tenor saxophone
Howard Johnson - bass clarinet, tuba  
Robert Northern - french horn
Julian Priester - trombone
Ron Carter - bass
Lenny White - drums

References

Blue Note Records albums
Andrew Hill albums
2003 albums
Albums recorded at Van Gelder Studio
Albums produced by Francis Wolff